Wahunkoha is a village in Sri Lanka. It is located in the Central Province in Udunuwara electorate .

See also
List of towns in Central Province, Sri Lanka

Populated places in Kandy District